Baron Macpherson of Drumochter, of Great Warley in the County of Essex, is a title in the Peerage of the United Kingdom. It was created in 1951 for the Scottish businessman, public servant and Labour politician Thomas Macpherson. He had previously represented Romford in Parliament.  the title is held by his grandson, the third Baron, who succeeded his father in 2008. His heir is his son, the Hon. Daniel Thomas Macpherson, b. 23 January 2013.

Barons Macpherson of Drumochter (1951)
Thomas Macpherson, 1st Baron Macpherson of Drumochter (1888–1965)
(James) Gordon Macpherson, 2nd Baron Macpherson of Drumochter (1924–2008)
James Anthony Macpherson, 3rd Baron Macpherson of Drumochter (b. 1979)

The heir apparent is the present holder's son Hon. Daniel Thomas Macpherson (b. 2013).

References
Kidd, Charles, Williamson, David (editors). Debrett's Peerage and Baronetage (1990 edition). New York: St Martin's Press, 1990

Baronies in the Peerage of the United Kingdom
Noble titles created in 1951
Noble titles created for UK MPs